The Journal of African Economies is published five times a year by Oxford University Press on behalf of the Centre for the Study of African Economies, University of Oxford. The journal publishes economic analyses, focused entirely on Africa. Each issue contains applied research together with a comprehensive book review section and a listing of current working papers from around the world. According to the Journal Citation Report, the journal's impact factor was 1.196 in 2020.

External links 
 

Economics journals
African studies journals
Publications established in 1992
English-language journals
Quarterly journals
Oxford University Press academic journals